On 16 February 1986, a Boeing 737-281 operating a charter flight as China Airlines Flight 2265 went missing after executing a go-around after touching down at Penghu Airport, Taiwan. All 6 passengers and 7 crew members were confirmed dead.

Aircraft
The aircraft was a 17-year-old Boeing 737-200 with the registration B-1870 which was acquired by China Airlines in 1976.

The aircraft was the same one involved in the China Airlines Flight 831 hijacking on 9 March 1978.

Sequence of events
The aircraft took off from Taipei on 16 February 1986 at 18:09 local time on a flight to Penghu Airport, Magong. When the aircraft touched down at 19:05 the crew felt a violent vibration at the front of the aircraft. The pilots executed a go-around. After the aircraft departed the vicinity of the airport it crashed into the Pacific Ocean off the coast near the city of Magong. All 13 occupants were killed on impact.

See also
 List of accidents and incidents involving the Boeing 737
 List of accidents and incidents involving commercial aircraft
 China Airlines Flight 140
 China Airlines Flight 676, which also crashed during a go-around in 1998, exactly 12 years later.
 One-Two-GO Airlines Flight 269
 Tatarstan Airlines Flight 363
 Flydubai Flight 981
 Korean Air Flight 801

References

Airliner accidents and incidents with an unknown cause
Aviation accidents and incidents in 1986
Aviation accidents and incidents in Taiwan
Accidents and incidents involving the Boeing 737 Original
China Airlines accidents and incidents
1986 in Taiwan
February 1986 events in Asia
1986 disasters in Taiwan